This article displays the rosters for the participating teams at the 2003 Tournament of the Americas.

Group A

Argentina

Canada

Mexico

Puerto Rico

Uruguay

Group B

Brazil

Dominican Republic

United States

Venezuela

Virgin Islands

References

External links
2003 Panamerican Olympic Qualifying Tournament for Men, FIBA.com.
FIBA Americas 2003 - Men Basketball, LatinBasket.com.

2007
squads